Bacon Glacier is a glacier in Juneau City and Borough, Alaska, US, close to the Canada–United States border. It drains into Bacon Creek. Like many other place names in Alaska, Bacon Glacier also reflects the importance of food to the early prospectors and miners who came up with many of those names.

References

Glaciers of Alaska
Glaciers of Juneau, Alaska